Madagascar competed at the 1972 Summer Olympics in Munich, West Germany.

Results by event

Athletics
Men's 800 metres
Edouard Rasoanaivo
 Heat — 1:50.8 (→ did not advance)

Men's 1500 metres
Edouard Rasoanaivo
 Heat — 3:48.5 (→ did not advance)

Men's 4 × 100 m Relay
Ravelomanantsoa Goman, Alfred Rabenja, Ariyamongkol Ralainasolo, and Henri Rafaralahy 
 Heat — 40.58s (→ did not advance)

References
Official Olympic Reports

Nations at the 1972 Summer Olympics
1972
Olympics